The 2011 Aragon Superbike World Championship round is the seventh round of the 2011 Superbike World Championship. It took place on the weekend of June 17–19, 2011 at the Motorland Aragón circuit, near Alcañiz, Spain.

Results

Superbike race 1 classification

Superbike race 2 classification

Supersport race classification

Aragon Round
Aragon Superbike